Jamie Leigh Carey (born March 12, 1981 in Hutchinson, Kansas) is a former professional basketball player, playing the point guard position for the Connecticut Sun in the WNBA until her retirement in 2009.  Carey currently serves as the Assistant Director of the USA National Team.

High School years
Carey attended Horizon High School in Thornton, Colorado. She graduated as class valedictorian with a 4.0 GPA. She was named Colorado's Gatorade Player of the Year and a WBCA All-American. She participated in the 1999 WBCA High School All-America Game, where she scored three points.

College years
In 1999, Carey attended Stanford University, where she earned the Pac-10 Conference "Freshman of the Year" honors and broke Stanford's single season record for three pointers made with 81. However, she suffered several serious ankle injuries and concussions and spent much of the season on the sidelines.
She had surgery on her left ankle following the season and missed the following six months with rehab.
She came back to practice in October 1999, but could not continue as continuing pain in her ankle left her sidelined shortly after the start of the season. She was forced to retire from the sport and sat out the next two seasons. She was seen on her crutches cheering on her team on the bench and became a fan favorite. She continued to attend classes at Stanford, and was seen on campus limping on her crutches with her left ankle wrapped in a soft cast. She reportedly said her crutches were her best friends because she could not go anywhere without her crutches. A picture of her leaning on her crutches with an ice pack on her left ankle became the cover page of the Stanford women's basketball media guide in 2000, under the title "Courage".

She transferred to The University of Texas at Austin in 2002 after the school's doctors determined they could clear her from her concussions and maintain any treatment she would need.  She played three seasons there after successfully petitioning for a fifth and sixth year of NCAA eligibility. During her time at Texas, the team became a national championship contender with a Final Four appearance in 2003. She was a sociology major.

Stanford and Texas statistics

Source

USA Basketball
Carey was named to the team representing the USA at the 2003 Pan American Games. The team lost the opening game to Cuba, then rebounded to win their next five games, including an OT win against Brazil. Carey led the team with 18 points in the victory against Brazil. In their game against Canada, which they won by three points 56—53, Carey hit all six of her three-point attempts, setting a United States team record. They then faced Cuba for the gold medal, falling short 75–64 to take home the silver medal. Carey scored 9.6 points per game, representing the second highest point total on the team, and led the team in assist with 16.

WNBA career
Carey was drafted by the Phoenix Mercury in 2005 with the 31st overall pick and played for the Connecticut Sun until her retirement in April 2009.

Vital statistics
Position: Guard
Height: 5 ft. 6 in. / 1.68 m
College: University of Texas at Austin, Stanford University
Team(s): Connecticut Sun (WNBA)

Notes

External links
WNBA Player File
Stanford University Player File
University of Texas at Austin Player File
2005 WNBA Draft Prospect Profile

1981 births
Living people
American women's basketball players
Basketball players at the 2003 Pan American Games
Basketball players from Colorado
Basketball players from Kansas
Connecticut Sun players
Pan American Games medalists in basketball
Pan American Games silver medalists for the United States
People from Thornton, Colorado
Phoenix Mercury draft picks
Point guards
Sportspeople from Hutchinson, Kansas
Stanford Cardinal women's basketball players
Texas Longhorns women's basketball players
Medalists at the 2003 Pan American Games
United States women's national basketball team players